Valenciennea longipinnis, the Long-finned goby, or Puntang is a species of goby native to the Indian Ocean and the western Pacific Ocean where it can be found in lagoons and areas with substrates of fine sand at depths of mostly less than , occasionally down to  and rarely deeper than that.  This species can reach a length of  SL.  It is of minor importance to local commercial fisheries and can also be found in the aquarium trade.

See also
Maned goby

References

External links
 

Valenciennea
Taxa named by Edward Turner Bennett
Fish described in 1839